Ribniško Selo is a settlement immediately north of Maribor in northeastern Slovenia. It belongs to the City Municipality of Maribor.

There is a small chapel with a belfry at the end of a small valley northeast of the main settlement. Above the door casing the date of construction is given as 1679.

References

External links

Ribniško Selo on Geopedia

Populated places in the City Municipality of Maribor